Morten Kræmer (born 10 July 1967) is a retired Norwegian football defender.

He hails from Krokelvdalen and started his youth career in Kroken IL before joining Tromsdalen UIL. He made his senior debut for TUIL at the age of fifteen, but was signed by first-tier club Tromsø IL ahead of the 1986 season. The club won the 1986 Norwegian Football Cup, albeit without Kræmer playing the cup final, and contested the 1987–88 European Cup Winners' Cup. He played for Tromsø until July 2001, except for two short spells in Tromsdalen and IF Skarp, and played when Tromsø won the 1996 Norwegian Football Cup.

Kræmer was assistant coach for Tromsdalen in 2004, and director of sports in Tromsø since 2007.

References

1967 births
Living people
Sportspeople from Tromsø
Norwegian footballers
Tromsdalen UIL players
Tromsø IL players
Eliteserien players
Association football defenders